For information on all Southeastern Louisiana University sports, see Southeastern Louisiana Lions

The Southeastern Louisiana Lions women's basketball team is the women's basketball team that represents Southeastern Louisiana University in Hammond, Louisiana. The team currently competes in the Southland Conference. The Lions are currently coached by Ayla Guzzardo.

History

The Lady Lions competed in the Small College Division AIAW National Tournament four times.  Each tournament had a 16-member field.  The team won the tournament and the national championship in 1977.  The Lady Lions made Elite Eight and Final Four appearances in the 1977 and 1978 tournaments.

Postseason

AIAW College Division/Division II
The Lady Lions made four appearances in the AIAW National Division II Basketball Tournament, with a combined record of 5–3.

References

External links

External links